This is a list of viceroys of Sardinia.

Aragonese Viceroys
From 1418 to 1516 Sardinia was ruled by viceroys from the Crown of Aragon, which merged into the Monarchy of Spain in 1516.

1. Lluís de Pontons (1418-1419)

2. Joan de Corbera (1419-1420)

3. Riambau de Corbera (1420-1421)

4. Bernat de Centelles (1421-1437)

5. Francesc d'Erill i de Centelles (1437-1448)

6. Nicolás Carroz de Arborea (1460-1479)

7. Pere Maça de Liçana i de Rocafull (1479)

8. Ximén Pérez Escrivá de Romaní (1479-1483) (first time)

9. Guillem de Peralta (1483-1484)

Ximén Pérez Escrivá de Romaní (1484-1487) (second time)

10. Iñigo Lopez de Mendoza y Quiñones (1487 - 1491)

11. Juan Dusay (1491-1501) (first time)

12. Benito Gualbes (interim) (1501-1502)

Juan Dusay (1502-1507) (second time)

13. Jaume Amat i Tarré (1507-1508)

14. Fernando Girón de Rebolledo (1508-1515)

15. Àngel de Vilanova (1515-1529)

Spanish direct rule, 1516–1714
 Martín de Cabrera (1529-1532)
 Jaime de Aragall (interim) (1533)
 Francisco de Serra (interim) (1533)
 Antonio Folc de Cardona y Enriquez (1534-1549)
 Pedro Veguer, Bishop of Alghero, Interim for absence, 1542 to 1545
 Jerónimo Aragall (interim) (1549-1550) (1st time)
 Lorenzo Fernández de Heredia (1550-1556)
 Jerónimo Aragall (interim) (1556) (2nd time)
 Álvaro de Madrigal (1556-1569)
 Jerónimo Aragall, Virrey Interino por Ausencia, en 1561 (3rd time)
 Juan IV Coloma y Cardona, 1st Count of Elda (1570-1577)
 Jerónimo Aragall (interim) (1577-1578) (4th time)
 Miguel de Gurrea y Moncada (1578-1584) first term, Viceroy of Majorca, 1575 - 1578 
 Gaspar Vicente Novella, Archbishop of Cagliari, Viceroy during a leave, 1584 - 1586
 Miguel de Gurrea y Moncada, 1586 - 1590, second term
 Gastón de Moncada, 2nd Marquis of Aitona (1590-1595)
 Antonio Coloma y Saa, 2nd Count of Elda (1595-1603)
 Alfonso Lasso y Sedeño, Archbishop of Cagliari, Viceroy during a leave, (1597 - 1599)
 Juan de Zapata, Viceroy during a leave, (1601 - 1602)
 Jaime Aragall (interim) (1603-1604) (1st time)
 Pedro Sánchez de Calatayud, Count of Real (1604-1610)
 Jaime Aragall (interim) (1610-1611) (2nd time)
 Carlos de Borja, Duke of Gandia (1611-1617)
 Alonso de Eril, 1st Count of Eril (1617-1623)
 Luis de Tena (interim) (1623)
 Juan Vives de Canyamás, Baron of Benifayró (1623-1625)
 Diego de Aragall (interim) (1625) (1st time)
 Pedro Ramón Zaforteza, Count of Santa María de Formiguera (Capitán General) (1625-1626)
 Jerónimo Pimentel, Marquis of Bayona (1626-1631)
 Diego de Aragall (interim) (1631) (2nd time)
 Gaspar Prieto, Archbishop of Alghero (interim) (1631-1632)
 Antonio de Urrea, Marquis of Almonacir (1632-1637)
 Diego de Aragall (interim) (1637-1638) (3rd time)
 Gianadrea Doria, Prince of Melfi (1638-1639)
 Diego de Aragall (interim) (1639-1640) (4th time)
 Fabrizio Doria, Duke of Arellano (1640-1644)
 Luis Guillermo de Moncada, 7th Duke of Montalto (1644-1649)
 Bernardo Matías de Cervelló (interim) (1649) (1st time)
 Giangiacomo Teodoro Trivulzio (1649-1651)
 Duarte Álvarez de Toledo, Count of Oropesa (1651)
 Beltrán Vélez de Guevara, Marquis of Campo Real (1651-1652)
 Pedro Martínez Rubio, Archbishop of Palermo (1652-1653)
 Francisco Fernández de Castro Andrade, Count of Lemos (1653-1657)
 Bernardo Matías de Cervelló (interim) (1657) (2nd time)
 Francisco de Moura, 3rd Marquis of Castel Rodrigo (1657-1661)
 Pedro Vico, Archbishop of Cagliari (interim) (1661-1662)
 Niccolò Ludovisi, Prince of Piombino (1662-1664)
 Bernardo Matías de Cervelló (interim) (1664-1665) (3rd time)
 Manuel de los Cobos, 4th Marquis of Camarasa (1665-1668)
 Francisco de Tutavila y del Rufo, Duke of San Germán (1668-1672)
 Fernando Joaquín Fajardo de Zúñiga Requesens, Marquis of los Vélez (1673-1675)
 Melchor Cisternes de Oblite (interim) (1675) (1st time)
 Francisco de Benavides de la Cueva, Marquis of las Navas (1675-1677)
 Melchor Cisternes de Oblite (interim) (1679-1680) (2nd time)
 José de Funes y Villalpando, Marquis of Ossera (1680)
 Philip of Egmont, Count of Egmont (1680-1682)
 Diego Ventura, Archbishop of Cagliari (interim) (1682)
 Antonio López de Ayala Velasco, Count of Fuensalida (1682-1686)
 José Delitala y Castelví (interim) (1686-1687)
 Niccolò Pignatelli, Duke of Monteleone (1687-1690)
 Carlos Homo Dei Moura y Pacheco, Marquis of Castel Rodrigo (interim) (1690)
 Luis Moscoso Ossorio, Count of Altamira (1690-1696)
 José de Solís Valderrábano Dávila, Count of Montellano (1697-1699)
 Fernando de Moncada, Duke of San Juan (1699-1703)
 Francisco Ginés Ruiz de Castro, Count of Lemos (1703-1704)
 Baltasar de Zúñiga y Guzmán, Marquis of Valero (1704-1706)
 Pedro Manuel Colón de Portugal, 7th Duke of Veragua (1706-1709), last viceroy supporting Philip V of Spain. Sardinia was conquered in 1708 by pro-Habsburg Spanish troops on a British fleet.  
 Fernando de Silva y Meneses, Count of Cifuentes (1709-1710), Supported Charles III of Spain
 Jorge de Heredia, Count of Fuentes (1710-1711)
 Andrés Roger de Eril, Count of Eril (1711-1713)

At the end of the War of the Spanish Succession, by the Treaty of Rastatt (1714), Sardinia was ceded to Austria.

Austrian Viceroys

 Pedro Manuel, Count of Atalaia (1713-1717)
 José Antonio de Rubí y Boxadors, Marquis of Rubí (1717)

Spanish Viceroys
The island was briefly reconquered by Spain during the War of Quadruple Alliance.

 Juan Francisco de Bette, Marquis of Leide (1717-1718)
 Gonzalo Chacón (1718-1720)

Savoyard Viceroys
In 1720, Sardinia was ceded to Savoy by the Treaty of The Hague.

1720 - 1724                Filippo-Guglielmo Pallavicini, baron di St. Rémy (1st time)

1724 - 1726                Doria Del Marco

1726 - 1728                Filippo-Guglielmo Pallavicini, baron di St. Rémy (2nd time)

1728 - 1730                Pedro, marchese di Cortanye

1730 - 1735                Girolamo Galletti, marchese di Castagnole i di Barolo
 
1735 - 1739                Carlo-Amadeo San-Martino, marchese di Rivarolo

1739 - 1741                Conte d'Allinge d'Apremont

1741 - 1745                Barone di Blonay

1745 - 1748                Del-Carretto, marchese di Santa-Giulia

1748 - 1751                Emanuele, principi di Valguarnera

1751 - 1755                Giamnattista Cacherano, conte di Brischerasio

1755 - 1763                Costa, conte della Trinitá

1763                       Giambattisa Alfieri

1763                       Solaro De Govone

1763 - 1767                Lodovico Costa Della Trinitá

1767 - 1771                Vittorio-Lodovico d'Hallot, conte des Hayes

1771 - 1773                Caissotti, conte di Roubion

1773 - 1777                Filippo Ferrero, marchese di La Marmora

1777 - 1781                Giuseppe-Vincenzo-Francesco-Maria Lascaris, marchese della Rocchetta

1781 - 1783                Carlo-Francesco De Valperga, conte di Masino

1783 - 1787                Solaro de Maretta

1787 - 1790                conte Thaon de Sant 'Andrea
 
1790 - 1794                Carlo Balbiano

1794 - 1799                Filippo, marchese Vivalda

1799 - 1802                Duke Charles Felix of Savoy (1st time)

1802 - 1814                no viceroys (Royal direct rule)

1814 - 1817                Duke Charles Felix of Savoy (2nd time)

1817 - 1820                Ignazio Thaon De Revel, conte di Pratolungo

1820 - 1822                Ettore Veuillet, marchese d'Yenne

1822 - 1823                Giuseppe-Maria Galleani, conte di d'Agliano

1823 - 1824                Gennaro Roero, conte di Monticelli

1824 - 1829                Giuseppe Tornielli, conte di Vergano

1829 - 1831                Giuseppe-Maria Robert, conte di Castelvero

1831 - 1840                Giuseppe-Maria Montiglio d'Ottiglio ed Villanova

1840 - 1843                Giacomo, conte d'Asarta

1843 - 1848                Claudio Gabriele de Launay

In the 1847 Perfect Fusion, Sardinia was merged into the mainland holdings of the House of Savoy and the office of Viceroy was abolished the following year.

Sources 
 Virreinato de Cerdeña
Worldstatesmen

 
Sardinia
History of Sardinia
.Viceroys